Season 2005–06 was a season of missed opportunities for Hibernian. The team started strongly in the league, winning 10 of their first 14 games, but this form dipped after Christmas. The Scottish Cup seemed to be opening up for Hibs after they defeated Rangers 3–0 at Ibrox in the fourth round, but they then lost 4–0 in an Edinburgh derby semi–final against Hearts. Hibs lost 3–0 in the quarter–final of the Scottish League Cup at Dunfermline, and were well beaten by Dnipro Dnipropetrovsk in the UEFA Cup.

Pre-season 
Hibs went on a three match tour of Ireland in early July, beating St Patrick's Athletic and drawing with Cork City and Shamrock Rovers. This was followed by a series of friendly matches against Scottish Football League clubs. Unusually, two of these matches were played on the same day as Hibs split their squad between matches at Ayr United and Queen of the South. Hibs then played a match against Rot-Weiss Essen to mark the 50th anniversary of the first European Cup competition before completing their pre-season schedule with a 1–0 win against Hartlepool United.

Results

League season 
Hibs began the season inauspiciously, drawing 1–1 at home to Dunfermline, although a draw represented something of a recovery having been a goal and a man down at half time. The second match was an Edinburgh derby at Tynecastle, where Hibs felt the full brunt of a powerful new Hearts side under the management of George Burley. Hibs lost 4–0 as Hearts went on to start the season with eight consecutive league wins.

Hibs themselves then went on a run of form, winning four league games in a row. The obvious highlight of this run was a 3–0 win at Ibrox, which was Hibs' first win there since 1995. Ivan Sproule, who had been thinking of returning to his native Northern Ireland, scored all the goals as a second-half substitute for Garry O'Connor. Sproule became the first visiting player to score a hat-trick at Ibrox since Allan Johnston did it for Hearts in 1996, and the first Hibs player to achieve the feat in more than 100 years.

Although Hibs then lost home matches to Celtic and Inverness immediately after their European ties, they then went on another run of victories, this time five in succession. The highlight of this run was the 2–0 Edinburgh derby win against Hearts, which ended their unbeaten start to the season. Despite a home defeat by Falkirk where Hibs had led 2–0, a convincing 2–1 win against Rangers led to media speculation that Hibs could challenge for the league title, which Tony Mowbray played down.

Results

Final table

UEFA Cup 
Having finished third in the Scottish Premier League table in the previous season, Hibs qualified directly into the first round proper of the UEFA Cup. They were drawn against Ukrainian Premier League side Dnipro Dnipropetrovsk, with Hibs due to play at home first. The match at Easter Road was a goalless draw, although Hibs hit the woodwork twice. Dnipro took the lead early in the return match thanks to a deflected goal, but Derek Riordan equalised midway through the first half. Hibs conceded two goals before half-time, however, and Dnipro added two more late goals on the counter-attack. This eliminated Hibs at the first hurdle, as they had been in their previous entry in 2001.

Results

Scottish League Cup 
As one of the European qualifiers from the previous season, Hibs were given a bye to the last 16 of the competition. In that round they defeated Ayr United 2–1 at Somerset Park. In the quarter-final, Hibs were drawn to play Dunfermline Athletic at East End Park. Dunfermline were struggling in the SPL and had recently lost at home to Hibs in the league, but they turned this form on its head to comfortably beat Hibs 3–0 in the League Cup, ending Hibs' involvement in the competition.

Results

Scottish Cup 
Hibs had a straightforward win in the last 32 of the Scottish Cup at home to Arbroath. In the last 16 they were given the daunting task of facing Rangers at Ibrox, although Hibs had won 3–0 at Ibrox earlier in the season thanks to Ivan Sproule's hat-trick. Their preparations for the game were not helped when Rangers made an offer to sign Derek Riordan, Hibs' top scorer, in the week before the match. Hibs rejected Rangers' offer, but accepted offers from foreign clubs that Riordan himself turned down. This transfer activity led Tony Mowbray to decide to leave Riordan on the bench for the match at Ibrox, just as he had done before the previous match at that ground that season. Riordan ended up making a cameo appearance, setting up the third goal for Chris Killen in a second 3–0 win for Hibs at Ibrox, and their third victory in all over Rangers that season. Garry O'Connor and Sproule had scored Hibs' first two goals early in the second half, with Simon Brown gaining some credit for producing an excellent save from Bob Malcolm during the first half.

With Celtic having already been eliminated in a shock defeat by Clyde in the last 32, the Scottish Cup had been opened up for a first winner from outside the Old Firm since Hearts in 1998. The first Scottish Cup Final without an Old Firm club present since 1997 was also guaranteed by those two results. In the quarter-final, Hibs were drawn to play SPL club Falkirk away. Hibs progressed through to the semi-final after a 5–1 victory at the Falkirk Stadium. Hibs were joined in the semi-finals by Edinburgh derby rivals Hearts and Scottish Football League clubs Dundee and Gretna. Gretna beat Dundee 3–0 in the first semi-final, leaving Hibs and Hearts to contest the right to face a Second Division side in a Cup Final where they would be heavy favourite.

The problem for Hibs was that they had been seriously weakened by the time of that semi-final. Derek Riordan had not been sold in the January window, but was suspended for the semi-final after collecting a second yellow card of the competition against Falkirk. Garry O'Connor had been sold to Lokomotiv Moscow straight after the quarter-final win. Chris Killen had failed a late fitness test and Paul Dalglish was cup-tied to Livingston. Midfielders Scott Brown and Michael Stewart were also unavailable due to injury.

These selection problems, particularly in attack, meant that Mowbray drafted in Moroccan youngster Abdessalam Benjelloun for his debut, and also started with youngster Steven Fletcher in attack. He also juggled the other areas of the team by moving Gary Caldwell into midfield and bringing Chris Hogg into defence. The makeshift Hibs side lost the match 4–0 and had Sproule and Gary Smith sent off. Former Hibs player Paul Hartley scored a hat-trick, leaving Mowbray to wonder whether Hibs would have won if the absent players had been available.

Results

Transfers 
Hibs did not make many major changes from the squad that had finished third in the SPL in the previous season. Captain Ian Murray moved to Rangers under freedom of contract, while Hibs signed Michael Stewart, who had been on loan at Hearts. Tony Mowbray also signed Zbigniew Małkowski to play in goal, as Simon Brown had made some errors towards the end of the previous season.

During the winter, Hibs brought in Chris Killen, Oumar Kondé and Paul Dalglish in an attempt to strengthen a squad that was being stretched by injuries. The only major transfer during the season was the sale of Garry O'Connor to Lokomotiv Moscow at the start of March 2006. This transfer went ahead outside of the normal British transfer windows because the Russian Premier League transfer window was still open. O'Connor's transfer started a trend of Hibs selling players, as Kevin Thomson, Scott Brown, Steven Whittaker and David Murphy all moved for fees in excess of £1.5M over the course of the next two years.

Players In

Players Out

Loans In

Loans Out

Player stats 
During the 2005–06 season, Hibs used 31 different players in competitive games. The table below shows the number of appearances and goals scored by each player.

|}

See also
List of Hibernian F.C. seasons

References

External links
First Team Fixtures 2005/2006, Hibernian F.C. official site
Hibernian 2005/2006 results and fixtures, Soccerbase

Hibernian F.C. seasons
Hibernian